Dodd House may refer to:

Dodd Homestead, Rehoboth Beach, Delaware, listed on the National Register of Historic Places (NRHP)
A. B. C. Dodd House, Charles City, Iowa, NRHP-listed
Dodd College President's Home, Shreveport, Louisiana, NRHP-listed
Dodd-Hinsdale House, Raleigh, NC, NRHP-listed
Dodd--Harkrider House, Abilene, Texas, NRHP-listed
Dodd House (Spokane, Washington), listed on the NRHP in Spokane County
Osage Mission Infirmary, St. Paul, Kansas, NRHP-listed

See also
David O. Dodd Memorial, Little Rock, AR, NRHP-listed
Thomas J. Dodd Research Center, of University of Connecticut libraries
Dodds House, of Wright Quadrangle on the Bloomington campus of Indiana University